Kulionys is a village in Lithuania (Molėtai district municipality), near Molėtai, mostly famous for its Molėtai Astronomical Observatory and Lithuanian Museum of Ethnocosmology. According to the 2011 census, the town has a population of 34 people.

References

Villages in Utena County
Molėtai District Municipality